The Leitrim Way is a 56km long-distance trail between Leitrim village, and Manorhamilton County Leitrim, Ireland.  This route is generally completed over 2–3 days, and brings walkers through a variety of landscape forms common to this beautiful part of the northwest of Ireland.  The Leitrim Way forms part of Ireland's National Waymarked Ways.

This strenuous route will bring walkers through series of mountain passes, forest roads, river side paths, small farmlands and quiet Boreens, passing closely to rural villages such as Glenfarne, Ballinagleragh and Coollegraine. Visitors will find historic heritage sites unique to the area, such as the famous Sweathouses dotted throughout the countryside.

The Leitrim Way has become popular with long distance trail runners, with the current "Fastest Known Time" of completion to be 5hours 11mins by local runner Ricki Wynne.

The route meets other long distance trails, such as the Cavan Way at Dowra or the Miners Way and Historical Trail near Leitrim Village.  Walkers can combine sections of The Leitrim Way to form longer guided walks, such as The Ireland Way, the Beara-Breifne Way, or the E2 European Ramblers Association epath . 

The route was closed/partly closed for a number of years throughout 2007-2018; however it is presently fully open and undergoing improvement works along the 56km route.  This includes reroutes to improve safety and the walker's experience.  These upgrade works are overseen by The Leitrim Way Management Committee, who work to improve the condition of the trail and promote the route.

References

Long-distance trails in the Republic of Ireland